These are the Group A Results and Standings:

Standings

Results/Fixtures

All times given below are in Central European Time.

Game 1
November 6, 2007

Game 2
November 13, 2007

Game 3
November 20, 2007

Game 4
November 27, 2007

Game 5
December 4, 2007

Game 6
December 11, 2007

Game 7
December 18, 2007

Game 8
January 8–9, 2008

Game 9
January 15, 2008

Game 10
January 22, 2008

External links

Group A
2007–08 in Spanish basketball
2007–08 in Bosnia and Herzegovina basketball
2007–08 in German basketball
2007–08 in Turkish basketball
2007–08 in British basketball
2007–08 in Lithuanian basketball